nakitakunalu is Yuki Uchida's fifth album (including one EP), released in Japan on 10 October 1996 by King Records (reference: KICS-600). It reached number 18 on the Oricon charts.

Track listing
  
  
  
  
  
  
  
  
  
  (Bonus track) 
  (Bonus track)

1996 albums
Yuki Uchida albums